Jacob De Witt (September 17, 1785 – March 23, 1859) was a Quebec businessman and political figure.

He was born in Windham, Connecticut in 1785, of Dutch descent, and came to Montreal with his family around 1802. He set up a hardware business with a partner in 1814, opening his own business three years later. He owned a steamship that transported goods on the Saint Lawrence River and owned land and a sawmill in Beauharnois County. De Witt was elected to represent Beauharnois in the Legislative Assembly of Lower Canada and elected again in 1834. Although he supported the parti patriote and voted in support of the Ninety-Two Resolutions, he did not take an active part in the Lower Canada Rebellion. He was a charter member of the Bank of Canada and one of the founders of La Banque du Peuple at Montreal. De Witt was elected to represent Leinster electoral district in an 1842 by-election; he was reelected in 1844. He was elected in Beauharnois in 1848 and in Châteauguay in 1854. He helped organize and served as chairman for the Anti-Seigniorial Tenure Convention and signed the Montreal Annexation Manifesto. De Witt helped establish the Montreal and Bytown Railway and was a founder and director of the Montreal City and District Savings Bank.

He died in Montreal in 1859.

References

 

1785 births
1859 deaths
American emigrants to pre-Confederation Quebec
American people of Dutch descent
Canadian people of Dutch descent
Members of the Legislative Assembly of Lower Canada
Members of the Legislative Assembly of the Province of Canada from Canada East
People from Windham, Connecticut